Sameer A. Gardezi (born 1983) is a WGA Award Winning Pakistani American Muslim screenwriter and television writer who has written for Aliens in America, the Golden Globe nominated, Emmy-winning hit series Modern Family., Mr. Sunshine, Outsourced and Goodwin Games.

Sameer has written for several networks including Nickelodeon, Comedy Central, The CW, FOX, ABC and NBC and studios such as 20th Century, Universal and Disney.  For his work on Modern Family, he was awarded a Writer’s Guild Award for his excellence in writing. Most recently, he collaborated with Daily Show's Trevor Noah to create the UNTITLED TREVOR NOAH PROJECT.

References

American male screenwriters
Living people
1983 births
American people of Pashtun descent
American people of Pakistani descent